The soundtrack to Indiana Jones and the Temple of Doom is a score release of the film's music, first released on CD, LP, and cassette in 1984 and reissued on CD in 2008.

Numerous cues from the film were missing from the soundtrack's initial LP issue due to the inherent length limitations of a single LP (approximately forty minutes). After the release of an extended Raiders of the Lost Ark soundtrack album in 1995, there was some hope of a more complete release of the Temple of Doom score. This was eventually realized in November 2008 by the Concord Music Group as part of a five-CD boxed set that also included the soundtracks for Raiders of the Lost Ark, Indiana Jones and the Last Crusade and Indiana Jones and the Kingdom of the Crystal Skull.

Track listing

Concord Release
The soundtrack to Temple of Doom was re-released on CD in November 2008 with expanded and remastered versions of Raiders of the Lost Ark and The Last Crusade. The set includes material never before issued from the original albums.

2008 Concord Set

*Previously Unreleased

The Indiana Jones Trilogy
Silva released a new version of Williams' Indiana Jones music entitled "The Indiana Jones Trilogy" on January 21, 2003. It features various cues from the entire trilogy, with five from Raiders. However, although they use the original manuscripts, this is a re-recording performed by the City of Prague Philharmonic Orchestra. Helen Hobson provides both the Cantonese and English lyrics for "Anything Goes" in these recordings.

Missing music
Several cues from Temple of Doom have yet to be released.

"Anything Goes Playoff"
"A Tribute to Vernon"
"Once in a Vial (Dance Orchestra)"
"The Indian Village"
"The Old Priest's Tale"
"The Child Returns"
"To Pankot Palace" (the version presented on the Concord set is not the film version)
"Entrance of the Boy King"
"Palace Source"
"The First Supper"
"Exchange of Glances"
"Moloram's Speech"
"The Evil Potion"
"Willy in the Fryer"
"The Rope Bridge"
"End Credits" (the version presented in all sets is an abridged version combining the opening of "Return to the Village/Raiders March" with the majority of this cue)

References

Indiana Jones music
1984 soundtrack albums
1980s film soundtrack albums
Polydor Records soundtracks
John Williams soundtracks